The Meridian Star is a newspaper published in Meridian, Mississippi. Formerly a daily newspaper, it switched to a triweekly format in 2020, publishing on Tuesday, Thursday, and Saturday  mornings. The paper covers Lauderdale County and adjoining portions of western Alabama and eastern Mississippi. It is owned by Community Newspaper Holding, Inc.

Founded as The Evening Star in 1898 by Charles Pinckney Dement and his son James Washington Dement, the paper was published each afternoon until early 2005, when morning delivery was implemented. The paper was renamed The Meridian Star in 1915 and has been Meridian's only daily newspaper since 1921.

Jack Wardlaw, the Baton Rouge bureau chief of the New Orleans Times-Picayune, began his journalism career at The Star in 1959 as a city hall reporter.

According to the masthead, the price for a single copy is $1.50 for all print editions.

References

External links
The Meridian Star Website
CNHI Website

Newspapers published in Mississippi
Lauderdale County, Mississippi
Meridian, Mississippi
Publications established in 1898
1898 establishments in Mississippi
Triweekly newspapers